Aldershot  is a constituency in Hampshire represented in the House of Commons of the UK Parliament since 2017 by Leo Docherty, a Conservative.

Political history
Aldershot has elected a Conservative as its MP since its creation in 1918.

From 1974 to 2010 (inclusive) Liberal Democrats (or predecessor, Liberals) polled second. In 2015 and 2017 the Labour candidate was runner-up.

The 2015 result saw the seat rank 123rd safest of the Conservative Party's 331 seats by percentage of majority.  In June 2016, 57.9% of local adults voting in the EU membership referendum chose to leave the European Union instead of to remain. This was matched in two January 2018 votes in Parliament by its MP.

In the 2017 general election, Leo Docherty won the seat after Howarth retired. The seat saw a further increase in the Labour vote, like much of the South East amid its national rise to 40% of the vote, the highest since 2001 when the party was in government.

Boundaries

1918–1950: The Urban Districts of Aldershot, Farnborough, and Fleet, and the Rural District of Hartley Wintney.

1950–1974: The Borough of Aldershot, the Urban Districts of Farnborough and Fleet, and the Rural District of Hartley Wintney. The constituency boundaries remained unchanged.

1974–1983: The Borough of Aldershot, the Urban Districts of Farnborough and Fleet, and in the Rural District of Hartley Wintney the parishes of Crondall, Crookham Village, Hawley, and Yateley.

1983–1997: The Borough of Rushmoor, and the District of Hart wards of Eversley, Frogmore and Darby Green, Hartley Wintney, Hawley, Whitewater, Yateley East, Yateley North, and Yateley West.

1997–2010: The Borough of Rushmoor, and the District of Hart wards of Frogmore and Darby Green, Hawley, Yateley East, Yateley North, and Yateley West.

2010–present: The Borough of Rushmoor, and the District of Hart wards of Blackwater and Hawley, and Frogmore and Darby Green.

Constituency profile
The constituency includes the towns Aldershot and Farnborough in the north-east of Hampshire which have research, development and production sites of information technology and light industrial major commercial businesses such as in aviation at Farnborough Airport, storage and distribution, and military supply businesses.  Aldershot is a major training and residential base of the British Army.  Adding to steady employment and high income sectors, two 35 minutes to one-hour journey time passenger lines to Central London, serve the south and north of the mixed functionalist urban and leafy, relatively grand suburbia seat.

Aldershot itself has some Labour councillors, along with one strong ward in Farnborough (Cherrywood), but the majority of wards, particularly in the smaller rural towns and villages are safely Conservative, the latter holding the seat with solid or large majorities from its creation 100 years ago.

Members of Parliament

Elections

Elections in the 1910s

Elections in the 1920s

Elections in the 1930s

Elections in the 1940s

Elections in the 1950s

Elections in the 1960s

Elections in the 1970s

Elections in the 1980s

Elections in the 1990s

Elections in the 2000s

Elections in the 2010s

See also
List of parliamentary constituencies in Hampshire

Notes

References

Parliamentary constituencies in Hampshire
Constituencies of the Parliament of the United Kingdom established in 1918
Aldershot